Tainton is a surname. Notable people with the surname include:

 Blossom Tainton-Lindquist (born 1962), Swedish singer, dancer, publisher, fitness coach, and personal trainer
 Graham Tainton (born 1927), Swedish dancer and choreographer
 Trevor Tainton (born 1948), English footballer